Calcutta Medical College, officially Medical College and Hospital, Kolkata, is a public medical school and hospital in Kolkata, West Bengal, India. It is the oldest existing hospital in Asia. The institute was established on 28 January 1835 by Lord William Bentinck during British Raj as Medical College, Bengal. It is the second oldest medical college to teach Western medicine in Asia after Ecole de Médicine de Pondichéry and the first institute to teach in English language. The hospital associated with the college is the largest hospital in West Bengal. The college offers  MBBS degree after five and a half years of medical training.

Rankings 

Medical College, Kolkata ranked 43rd among Medical Institution by National Institutional Ranking Framework (NIRF) in 2022.

Politics

Student politics is rooted in tradition, with many students participating in the Indian freedom struggle. Anti-British movements were implemented with the programmes of Bengal Provincial Students' Federation (BPSF), the Bengal branch of All India Students' Federation. Student politics was initially focused on the independence of India. In 1947, Sree Dhiraranjan Sen, a student of the college, died during a Vietnam Day police firing. The Vietnam Students’ Association passed a resolution in its Hanoi session in memory of Sen in March 1947.

Student politics were highly influenced by the partition of Bengal and communal riots during and after the partition of India. Between 1946 and 1952, the college's doctors stood for communal harmony and worked hard in the refugee colonies. During 1952, ex-students of the college, among them Bidhan Chandra Roy who became the second Chief Minister of West Bengal, established the Students' Health Home for the welfare of students.

From the 1950s to the 1970s, the college became a centre of leftist and far-left politics. Student politics was highly influenced by the Naxalbari uprising in the early 1970s.

Development

In August 2003, the then union health minister Sushma Swaraj had given the in-principle assented nod to the upgrade of MCH, Kolkata on the lines of AIIMS.

Notable alumni
 Lamu Amatya, First Nepalese nurse 
 Pasupati Bose, Indian physician and professor of anatomy
 Upendranath Brahmachari, discoverer of the treatment of Kala-azar
 Aroup Chatterjee, British Indian atheist physician, author of Mother Teresa: The Untold Story
 Nirmal Kumar Dutta, Indian pharmacologist, medical academic and the director of Haffkine Institute
Lionel Emmett, member of the Indian field hockey team in the 1936 Summer Olympics
Sri Yukteshwar Giri, Indian Yogi 
 Dipyaman Ganguly, N-Bios laureate
 Kadambini Ganguly, the first certified South Asian female physician qualified for Western medical practice
 Madhusudan Gupta, the first Indian trained in Western medicine to dissect a human corpse.
 David Hare, founder of Hare School
 K. B. Hedgewar, also known as Doctorji, was the founding Sarsanghachalak of the Rashtriya Swayamsevak Sangh. 
 Vikram Marwah – Padma Shri awardee, conferred Dr. B. C. Roy Award by the President of India.
 Kamaleshwar Mukherjee, filmmaker
 M. D. Ray, surgical oncologist and author
 Balai Chand Mukhopadhyay
 N. C. Paul, first physician to examine yoga
 Bidhan Chandra Roy, noted physician and the 2nd Chief Minister of West Bengal
 Sisir Kumar Bose, noted paediatrician,nephew of Subhas Chandra Bose and son of Sarat Chandra Bose
 Ram Baran Yadav, first president of Nepal

See also
Calcutta Homoeopathic Medical College & Hospital
Calcutta Unani Medical College and Hospital
List of hospitals in India

References

Bibliography
 David Arnold, Colonizing the Body: State Medicine and Epidemic Disease in Nineteenth Century India, Delhi, 1993
 Calcutta Medical College, The Centenary of the Medical College, Bengal, 1835–1934. Calcutta, 1935
 
 Poonam Bala, Imperialism and Medicine in Bengal: A Socio-Historical Perspective, New Delhi, 1991
 Sen, S.N., Scientific and Technical Education in India 1781–1900, Indian National Science Academy, 1991

External links

 

 
Medical colleges in West Bengal
Universities and colleges in Kolkata
Hospitals in Kolkata
Affiliates of West Bengal University of Health Sciences
Academic institutions associated with the Bengal Renaissance
Educational institutions established in 1835
Hospitals established in 1835
1835 establishments in British India